WTVJ (channel 6) is a television station in Miami, Florida, United States, serving as the market's NBC outlet. It is owned and operated by the network's NBC Owned Television Stations division alongside Fort Lauderdale–licensed WSCV (channel 51), a flagship station of Telemundo. Both stations share studios on Southwest 27th Street in Miramar, while WTVJ's transmitter is located in Andover, Florida.

History

Florida's first television station

The station first signed on the air on March 21, 1949, at 12:00 p.m. WTVJ was the first television station to sign on in the state of Florida, and the 16th station in the United States. Originally broadcasting on VHF channel 4, the station was founded by Wometco Enterprises (founded by Mitchell Wolfson and Sidney Meyer), a national movie theater chain that was headquartered in Miami. The station's original studio facilities were located in the former Capitol Theater on North Miami Avenue in Downtown Miami, which was the first theater operated by Wometco when the company was founded in 1926. The station was a primary CBS affiliate, but also carried programming from the other three major broadcast networks of that era (ABC, NBC and DuMont). During the late 1950s, the station was also briefly affiliated with the NTA Film Network.

WTVJ was the only commercial television station in the Miami market until Fort Lauderdale-based WFTL-TV (channel 23) signed on the air on December 24, 1954, operating as an NBC affiliate. However, WFTL had no success whatsoever in competing against WTVJ, in part because television sets were not required to have UHF tuning capability until the All-Channel Receiver Act went into effect in 1964. NBC continued to allow WTVJ to cherry-pick programs broadcast by the network until WCKT (channel 7, now Fox affiliate WSVN) signed on in July 1956 and WFTL went dark (that station's former channel 23 allocation is now occupied by Univision owned-and-operated station WLTV-DT). Channel 4 shared ABC programming with WCKT, by way of an arrangement with the network to allow both stations to cherry-pick programming. Although ABC had a full-time affiliate in WITV (channel 17), due to the aforementioned lack of UHF penetration at that time, this arrangement continued until WPST-TV (channel 10, now WPLG) signed on in August 1957. WTVJ also served as the de facto CBS affiliate for West Palm Beach, until WTVX (channel 34, now a CW affiliate) signed on in 1966.

WTVJ served as the producing station for CBS' Jackie Gleason Show after Gleason moved the program from New York City to Miami Beach in 1964.

Acquisition by KKR
Wometco founder and president Mitchell Wolfson died in 1983. Though it had been theorized that a proper succession plan had been written up, Wolfson never disclosed it to his heirs or executives, nor in any of his estate planning. The remaining Wolfson heirs had no desire to keep the company in the family, and it quickly unraveled, making it a ripe takeover target. Investment firm Kohlberg Kravis Roberts & Co. took over Wometco in 1984 in a $1 billion deal, the largest corporate buyout in history to that date. KKR sold most of Wometco's entertainment assets to the latter company's chief operating officer Arthur Hertz in 1985. With the cash from this sale, KKR then purchased Storer Broadcasting's station properties, shortly after the Federal Communications Commission raised the television station ownership limit from seven stations (with no more than five located on the VHF band) to twelve. As with many of its 1980s acquisitions (including RJR Nabisco), it held a vulture capitalism strategy of flipping the stations to a new owner after several years, not intending to run them as long-term investments.

In 1986, KKR opted to put WTVJ and the Storer stations on the market. The firm had plans to sell channel 4 for a record price of close to $500 million (as part of a $1.85 billion group deal with six of the Storer stations), although the station was actually worth far less. CBS saw a chance to acquire an owned-and-operated station in the fast-growing Miami market. However, it lost a bidding war to television syndication company Lorimar-Telepictures. CBS, however, tried to block the deal; Lorimar produced Dallas, Knots Landing, Falcon Crest, and other shows for the network and did not want them controlling the clearance rights of those particular programs. Thus, CBS threatened to pull its affiliation with WTVJ if the Lorimar deal went through, which would force the station to become an independent. Lorimar then walked away from the group deal in May 1986. CBS then made an offer to buy WTVJ for $170 million, which was far below KKR's asking price of at least $270 million.

Acquisition by NBC
Over the next few months, the only offers to buy WTVJ came from companies that owned large groups of independent stations, such as Tribune Broadcasting, Pappas Telecasting Companies and Chris-Craft Industries/United Television. These and other companies wanted to convert WTVJ into an independent station or a Fox affiliate, for a price far lower than KKR's asking price. The only way that KKR could make such a large profit was to sell WTVJ to another network, as some potential buyers had no interest in keeping CBS while the only ones that could purchase the station for the asking price were ABC and NBC.

CBS did not believe that KKR would sell WTVJ to another network, so it returned with a very low offer. KKR turned CBS's offer down almost out of hand and then approached the other networks. ABC was not interested, since it was more than satisfied with its longtime affiliate, WPLG. However, NBC was very interested because its longtime affiliate, WSVN, heavily preempted the network's daytime lineup—including programs that the network aired in the noon timeslot, in favor of running a local newscast—as well as an occasional prime time show. NBC was far less tolerant of preemptions than CBS and ABC at the time and was particularly annoyed at losing valuable advertising in such a fast-growing market. This had not been a problem at first since most of the programs that were preempted by WSVN aired on West Palm Beach-based WPTV, which provided at least grade B signal coverage to nearly the entire Miami–Fort Lauderdale market, and had been available on cable in the area for decades. In the few cases where WPTV and WSVN both turned down an NBC program, the network usually arranged for other stations in the area to carry its programming. However, by 1985, WPTV had been dropped from most Miami cable systems to make way for new cable channels (partly due to limited headend channel capacity), resulting in some NBC programs that were preempted by WSVN being unavailable to some viewers. NBC realized that purchasing its own station with less restrictive ownership laws would guarantee that its entire network schedule would be cleared. Hence, it made an offer almost as high as Telepictures did a few months before, and in 1987, KKR agreed to sell WTVJ to NBC for $270 million.

NBC assumed control of WTVJ in mid-September 1987. However, both WTVJ's and WSVN's respective affiliation contracts with CBS and NBC did not expire until December 31, 1988. As a result, NBC faced the prospect of having to run WTVJ as a CBS affiliate for over a year. This did not sit well with either NBC or CBS, and both approached WSVN's parent Sunbeam Television about ending the station's NBC affiliation contract early. However, Sunbeam balked; its owner, Edmund Ansin, did not want to lose NBC's strong lineup of sports programming that year, including the Major League Baseball World Series and the Summer Olympics. Sunbeam also made an unsuccessful play to take the CBS affiliation. NBC did strip nearly all CBS branding from channel 4 and began airing nearly all NBC programs that were preempted by channel 7. In turn, this resulted in WTVJ preempting some CBS programs, with the affected shows airing instead on WCIX. CBS then formally approached channel 6, despite the fact that it would have provided a much weaker signal to Fort Lauderdale than that provided by WTVJ or WSVN. Accordingly, West Palm Beach's longtime ABC affiliate, WPEC, was persuaded by CBS to switch to the network in order to ensure full coverage in Fort Lauderdale and northern Broward County. In August 1988, CBS announced that it would purchase WCIX from the TVX Broadcast Group, which itself had purchased the station from Taft in 1987.

WTVJ ended its 40-year affiliation with CBS on January 1, 1989, and became the third station in Miami to have carried programming from NBC. CBS moved the rest of its programs over to WCIX, while WSVN became the new Fox affiliate for South Florida; most of WCIX's syndicated programs, such as most of its cartoons and sitcoms—with exceptions such as I Love Lucy, Family Ties, Star Trek: The Next Generation and a few others—went to WDZL (channel 39, now CW affiliate WSFL-TV). In a bit of irony, WTVJ also continued to preempt NBC's noon offerings in favor of carrying a local newscast. That timeslot would be given back to the network's affiliates in 1991. Shortly after the switch, the station debuted an image campaign based on the Bobby McFerrin song "Don't Worry, Be Happy", that lasted until 1993.

Move to channel 6

On July 14, 1994, after the E. W. Scripps Company signed a deal with ABC that renewed the network's affiliations with WEWS-TV in Cleveland and WXYZ-TV in Detroit (which were both heavily targeted by CBS to replace two stations that were slated to switch to Fox) and caused three other stations to switch to the network, Westinghouse Broadcasting (Group W) signed a long-term deal with CBS, in which three Westinghouse-owned stations (one that was aligned with ABC and two that also were aligned with NBC) would become CBS affiliates, joining two other stations owned by the company that were already affiliated with that network. (Westinghouse would later acquire CBS one year later in August 1995, turning all of the Group W radio and television stations into CBS owned-and-operated television and radio stations.) One of the stations involved in the affiliation agreement was Philadelphia's longtime NBC affiliate, KYW-TV. CBS decided to sell off its longtime O&O in that market, WCAU-TV, but later discovered that an outright sale of that station would have forced it to pay taxes on the proceeds from the deal. This led to a deal that was struck on November 21, 1994, between CBS and NBC, in which CBS sold the channel 6 transmitter facility and license to NBC as compensation for the loss of KYW-TV and Westinghouse's other NBC affiliate, WBZ-TV in Boston. In return, CBS received the stronger channel 4 transmitter facility, license, and cash as compensation for the loss of WCAU (KCNC-TV in Denver and KUTV in Salt Lake City [which was acquired by NBC earlier that year] were both purchased by, and ended up switching to CBS as a result of this deal).

In April 1995, WTVJ dropped all references to its channel 4 allocation outside of news programming in preparation for the channel swap. Newscasts continued to be branded as Channel 4 News until the move to channel 6; however, it rebranded as "WTVJ NBC" for all other purposes, using a logo that featured only the NBC peacock logo with the WTVJ call letters (rendered in the Univers typeface) placed below it.

At 1 a.m. on Sunday, September 10, 1995, WTVJ and WCIX swapped channels. WTVJ's entire intellectual unit (calls, shows, NBC network, and staff) moved from channel 4 to channel 6, while the intellectual unit of WCIX, which changed its calls accordingly to WFOR-TV, moved to channel 4. However, both stations retained their respective existing studio facilities. Due to the manner in which the transfer was structured, the two stations were required to swap licenses in addition to their transmitting facilities. As a result, WTVJ legally operated under the old WCIX license until the end of the analog broadcasting era. WPTV's signal in Fort Lauderdale is actually closer to city-grade than WTVJ's (though it still transmits a Grade B signal in the area). WTVJ inherited the two translators used by WCIX in Broward County, W27AQ in Pompano Beach and W58BU in Hallandale, and a third, W19BJ in Sunrise, was activated alongside the switch.

In April 1998, WTVJ sold its Capitol Theatre studios to the General Services Administration for $11.6 million, which planned to build a courthouse on the space where the building was located. Three months later, it was announced that the station had purchased a plot of land located off the intersection of I-75 and Miramar Parkway in Miramar, with plans to build a 64,000 square foot studio facility for the station; WTVJ moved into the newly constructed complex in 2000.

Aborted sale to Post-Newsweek
On March 19, 2008, NBCUniversal announced that it was putting WTVJ up for sale for an estimated asking price of $350 million. On July 18, Post-Newsweek Stations entered into an agreement to buy the station for $205 million; the purchase would have created a duopoly between WTVJ and Post-Newsweek-owned WPLG. Normally, FCC ownership rules prohibit the ownership of two of the four highest-rated television stations in a single market in terms of overall audience share. Under ordinary circumstances, this would preclude a duopoly between two "Big Three" stations; however, according to Nielsen, WPLG ranked in first place and WTVJ ranked sixth overall in total-day viewership during the May 2008 sweeps period, allowing the possibility of a purchase (WTVJ's sixth-place ranking was due to several factors including the station's own programming weaknesses at the time and the strong ratings performance of WLTV). Incidentally, this would have resulted in a rare instance in which the senior partner in one duopoly became the junior partner in another, as NBC had owned both WTVJ and WSCV.

Had the sale gone through, WTVJ would have consolidated its operations with WPLG at that station's Hallandale Beach Boulevard studios in Pembroke Park. Post-Newsweek would have also acquired all of WTVJ and WSCV's new high definition production equipment that was installed in the stations' Miramar studios. Despite a formal petition that was filed with the FCC against the proposed sale, the sale was approved by the Federal Trade Commission on October 6, 2008. However, the sale was canceled on December 23, 2008, citing poor economic conditions and the lack of FCC approval.

WTVJ today 
On March 21, 2009, WTVJ celebrated its 60th anniversary and aired a half-hour special called WTVJ: The First 60 Years, which highlighted the station's history since its March 21, 1949 sign-on.

On January 6, 2017, WTVJ and fellow NBC stations WFLA-TV in Tampa and WDIV-TV in Detroit were admonished by the FCC along with seven other stations for failure to comply fully with the sponsorship disclosure requirements of its political advertising rules. The stations were cited for such violations as not identifying the officials of the sponsoring organizations, not noting the issue that non-candidate spots addressed, and identifying a sponsor by an acronym rather than its full name.

Programming
As of September 2022, syndicated programming on WTVJ currently includes Access Hollywood, Dateline (in its syndicated package; first-run episodes of the series are also broadcast on the station through NBC), and The Kelly Clarkson Show, among others. The three shows are distributed by NBCUniversal Syndication Studios. WTVJ was also responsible for the production of the national lifestyle program iVillage Live, originally distributed exclusively to NBC owned-and-operated stations (with some NBC affiliates adding the show in its second season) from its debut in 2006; the production was moved to Chicago through their sister station WMAQ-TV in 2007 until its cancellation on March 28, 2008. Since September 2021, WTVJ is one of ten NBC-owned stations (including WNBC in New York, KNBC in Los Angeles, KNTV in San Francisco, WVIT in Hartford, WMAQ-TV in Chicago, KXAS-TV in Dallas, KNSD in San Diego, WRC-TV in Washington, D.C., and WCAU in Philadelphia, which was also a former CBS affiliate) which distribute programming either nationally and/or regionally.

Sports programming
In 1989, WTVJ became the primary home station for the NFL's Miami Dolphins (via NBC's rights at the time to air AFC games), succeeding WSVN in this capacity. Before, WTVJ only provided CBS coverage of Dolphins games played at home against an NFC team. The station also provided coverage of the Dolphins' Super Bowl VIII victory, as well as Super Bowls II and X which were hosted at the Miami Orange Bowl, plus Super Bowl XXIII which was played at Joe Robbie Stadium. This continued until 1997 when WFOR-TV gained the rights to most games thanks to CBS' acquisition of the AFC broadcast package. The station now airs Dolphins games when they appear on NBC's Sunday Night Football. WTVJ also aired the Florida Marlins' (now the Miami Marlins) first World Series triumph in 1997, when NBC had limited broadcast rights to Major League Baseball's postseason. The station also broadcast all Miami Heat games aired through NBC's broadcast contract with the NBA from 1990 to 2002, and all Florida Panthers games aired through NBC's broadcast contract with the NHL from 2006 to 2021.

News operation

WTVJ presently broadcasts 38 hours, 25 minutes of locally produced newscasts each week (with 6 hours, 35 minutes each weekday; three hours on Saturdays and 2½ hours on Sundays). During weather segments, WTVJ uses two Doppler weather radar systems, "TITAN" and "VIPIR". The VIPIR Radar is branded on-air as "Live First Alert Doppler."

Founding years
Soon after WTVJ signed on, the station hired Ralph Renick, who had just graduated from the University of Miami, as its first anchor and news director. Renick would serve as the face of WTVJ for nearly 36 years and became best known for his catchphrase at the end of every newscast, "Good night, and may the good news be yours." At the same time, the station also hired Bernie Rosen and Bob Weaver. One of the nation's first-ever television news meteorologists, Weaver reported the weather for the station for more than five decades. Rosen, who went on to run the station's award-winning sports department for more than three decades, was the last original employee still working at the station.  On February 6, 2008, Rosen was presented with the prestigious Golden Circle Award from the National Academy of Television Arts and Sciences, honoring Rosen for his more than 50 years of service to the South Florida television community. While many of South Florida's veteran television personalities have received the Silver Circle Award for marking 25 years in the business, the Golden Circle Award has been given only once before in South Florida, in 2004 when it went to Bob Weaver, also a lifelong WTVJ employee. After retiring in 2013, Rosen he remained with the station on a part time basis until his death in 2020.

1990s
During the early 1990s, WTVJ tried several different formats to accompany or add to their existing newscasts; these included a news/lifestyle hybrid show called South Florida at 4:30, anchored by Ana Azcuy and Ed O'Dell; a 5:30 newscast with separate anchors (Teresa Rodriguez and Steve Abrams) at both the main studio and a Fort Lauderdale studio for news coverage from that part of the area; and an hour-long 5:00 show called 4 News Now anchored by Tony Segreto that was focused on breaking news and long-form stories; 4 News Now was the longest-lived of these efforts, lasting until the spring of 1994 when the 5:00 hour was reverted to a normal newscast and a half-hour 4:30 broadcast was added. In August 1992, when Hurricane Andrew struck South Florida, WTVJ was the only station to provide non-stop coverage of the storm with the assistance of meteorologist Bryan Norcross; WTVJ's coverage of the hurricane earned the station several local Emmy Awards in 1993. Most of WTVJ's archival footage from 1949 to 2004 (as well as footage from other Florida television stations) is stored at the Lynn and Louis Wolfson II Florida Moving Image Archives in downtown Miami. In 1997, WTVJ and the South Florida Sun-Sentinel began co-producing a nightly 10 p.m. newscast on then-WB affiliate WDZL. The program was broadcast from a secondary set at WTVJ's studio facility. The program ended its run after eleven years on August 31, 2008, as the now-WSFL's owner Tribune Broadcasting opted not to renew its news share agreement with the station.

2000s
On September 10, 2007, WTVJ debuted the first 7 p.m. newscast in the market (airing only on weeknights), a format that NBC extended to several of its other owned-and-operated stations including WNBC in New York and KNSD in San Diego. At the same time, WTVJ dropped its 5 p.m. newscast, opting to fill the timeslot with The Ellen DeGeneres Show instead (this lasted until May 2011, when the station reinstated the 5 p.m. newscast, while concurrently canceling the 7 p.m. program). On March 5, 2008, WTVJ became the first television station in the Miami–Fort Lauderdale market and the fourth station in South Florida to begin broadcasting its local newscasts in high definition.

Recent years
On May 14, 2012, WTVJ debuted a half-hour midday newscast at 11:00 a.m.; it also launched a new entertainment and lifestyle program called NBC 6 in the Mix that follows the newscast, which is similar in format to sister station WSCV's Acceso Total, which airs in the same timeslot; both programs replaced an hour-long local talk/lifestyle program called Live Miami at 11 a.m. On July 18, 2012, WTVJ debuted a brand new set designed by Clickspring Design, and the new "Look F" graphics package designed by NBC ArtWorks that is used by the other NBC-owned stations. Additionally, WTVJ dropped most references to Miami in its branding, rebranding itself "NBC 6 South Florida".

On June 13, 2016, WTVJ debuted its 4:00 p.m. newscast, becoming the third station in Miami–Fort Lauderdale to do so, which competes against WPLG, who began airing its 4:00 p.m. newscast in January 2014, and WSVN, who began airing a 4 p.m. newscast in September 2006. In addition, WTVJ began using "Look N" graphics designed by NBC ArtWorks that is used by the other NBC-owned stations. The station also dropped the South Florida name and rebranding it as NBC 6 once again.

In March 2019, WTVJ canceled its half-hour 9:00 a.m. newscast on Sundays; two public affairs programs, Voices with Jawan Strader and Impact with Jackie Nespral replaced it in that period but they included a quick news update in between both shows. On August 31, 2020, WTVJ moved its midday newscast and its lifestyle/talk show 6 in the Mix to 12:00 p.m. and 12:30 p.m. respectively, while Access Daily moved to 11:00 a.m. Days of Our Lives meanwhile retained its network recommended slot at 1:00 p.m.

On July 22, 2021, WTVJ debuting its brand new set for first time in nine years, and they also switched the graphics and music themes respectively; the "Look N" package had replaced it with the "Look S" graphics package designed by NBC ArtWorks that is used by the other NBC-owned and Telemundo-owned stations, and the music theme had replaced them with "NBC 2021 News Theme", which is commissioned for sister station KNBC in Los Angeles.

On January 20, 2022, WTVJ launched a new 24-hour streaming channel made exclusively for NBCUniversal's streaming service Peacock, dubbed "NBC South Florida News" featuring the simulcasts and encores of the station's newscasts as well as the station's original content made for the channel. The new streaming channel comes following the announcement they would have a simultaneous rollout of streaming news channels with its sister stations in Chicago, Boston, and Philadelphia beginning on that date, with channels in New York and Los Angeles following suit on March 17. Prior to the launch of the streaming channel, the station had a curated playlist made available on the streaming service since its April 2020 launch.

Notable current on-air staff
 Jorge Andres – sports anchor
 John Morales (AMS Certified Broadcast Meteorologist/Certified Consulting Meteorologist and NWA Seals of Approval) – chief meteorologist
 Jackie Nespral – anchor

Notable former on-air staff

 David Bloom – reporter (1991–1993); later at NBC News; died in 2003
 Joel Connable – reporter (2005–2009); later president of Travel TV News Inc.; died in 2012
 Kevin Corke – anchor/reporter (2009–2011); now at Fox News)
 Katie Couric – reporter (1984–1986); later co-anchor of NBC's Today, anchor of CBS Evening News, host of syndicated talk show, and global news anchor for Yahoo News and ABC News
 Paul Deanno – chief meteorologist (2003–2009); now at KPIX-TV
 Jose Diaz-Balart – anchor/reporter (1988–1996; 2003–2010),  also anchor for Telemundo; now at MSNBC and Saturday anchor at NBC Nightly News)
 John Hambrick – anchor/reporter (1985–1990); later at WCIX; died in 2013
 Larry King – sports reporter (1964–1971); later host of Larry King Live at CNN, host of Larry King Now, and Politicking with Larry King; died in 2021
 Frank Mottek – anchor/reporter (1991–1992); now at KNX (AM)
 Chris Myers – sports anchor (1980–1982); now at Fox Sports 
 Bryan Norcross – meteorologist (1990–1996); now at Fox Weather
 Nancy Humphries (O'Dell) – anchor/reporter (1993–1995); later co-host of Access Hollywood until 2009 and host of Entertainment Tonight until 2019
 Micah Ohlman – anchor/reporter (2000–2002); now at KTLA
 Jerry Penacoli – host of PM Magazine; later correspondent for Extra
 Lonnie Quinn – meteorologist (2002–2007); now at WCBS-TV
 Ralph Renick – anchor (1949–1985); later at WCIX; died in 1991
 Joe Rose – sports anchor (1992–2014); retired
 Rick Sanchez – host/anchor (2003–2004); was most recently at RT America until its closure in 2022
 Kerry Sanders – reporter (1991–1996); now at NBC News
 Charlie Van Dyke – now a radio and television announcer, WTVJ served as one of his television station clients from 1984 to 1989, and again from 2005 to 2016 (now at WPTV-TV)
 Bob Weaver – meteorologist (1949–2003); died in 2006
 Chuck Zink – host of Skipper Chuck (1957–1979); died in 2006

Technical information

Subchannels
The station's ATSC 1.0 channels are carried on the multiplexed digital signals of other Miami-Fort Lauderdale television stations:

The station carried NBC Weather Plus on its second digital subchannel from 2004 to 2008, when the network began winding down operations and became an automated local weather channel known as NBC Plus. On February 25, 2009, WTVJ became the last NBC O&O to carry Universal Sports, airing it on digital subchannel 6.3; it was removed on January 1, 2012, when Universal Sports transitioned into a cable and satellite-only network. In early 2011, WTVJ's 4.2 digital subchannel switched its programming from NBC Plus to a 24-hour news and lifestyle network carried only on NBC's O&Os called NBC Nonstop (under the branding "NBC Miami Nonstop"; NBC Nonstop relaunched as Cozi TV on December 20, 2012); the subchannel also carried a weeknight 9 p.m. newscast, which was eventually cancelled.

Analog-to-digital conversion
WTVJ ended programming on its analog signal, on VHF channel 6, on June 12, 2009, the official date in which full-power television stations in the United States transitioned from analog to digital broadcasts under federal mandate. The station's digital signal continued to broadcasts on its pre-transition UHF channel 31. Through the use of PSIP, digital television receivers display the station's virtual channel as its former VHF analog channel 6. After the transition, the station moved its main transmitter from the former WCIX tower site in Homestead to a facility on the Broward–Dade county line, bringing WTVJ's signal on par with the other Miami television stations for the first time in fourteen years.

As part of the SAFER Act, WTVJ kept its analog signal on the air until June 26 to inform viewers of the digital television transition through a loop of public service announcements from the National Association of Broadcasters. After the programming loop was completed on June 26, the station ran a pre-recorded video of long time news anchor Bob Mayer introducing a black-and-white film clip of Ralph Renick uttering his closing phrase, "Good night... and may the good news be yours." marking the end of analog television on WTVJ.

ATSC 3.0 lighthouse

Former translators
The WTVJ signal was previously relayed on three other translators, W44AC (channel 44) in Key West, W58BU (channel 58) in Hallandale (from a transmitter in Pembroke Park) and W52BB (channel 52) in Big Pine Key. As a result, Fort Lauderdale and the rest of Broward County received a grade-B signal from the station's analog transmitter. After WTVJ discontinued its analog signal on June 26, 2009, W58BU remained on the air for nearly two years afterward; however, with WTVJ's digital transmitter now located in the same area as other major television stations in the market, the need for W58BU was diminished. The translator was shut down on April 5, 2011; NBC surrendered its license, with the FCC formally deleting it on June 2.

Out of market coverage 
WTVJ is one of two NBC stations carried by REV TV, a cable system serving The Bahamas; the other being KING-TV in Seattle.

References

External links

 

TVJ
Television channels and stations established in 1949
NBC Owned Television Stations
Cozi TV affiliates
LX (TV network) affiliates
Wometco Enterprises
National Football League primary television stations
1949 establishments in Florida
Orange Bowl
ATSC 3.0 television stations